Hugo Miguel da Encarnação Pires Faria (born 15 February 1983) is a Portuguese former footballer who played as a midfielder.

Club career
Born in São Brás de Alportel, Faro District, Faria played youth football for three clubs, including FC Porto from ages 16 to 18. He started his senior career with Louletano DC, with which he spent three seasons in the third division.

Faria moved straight to the Primeira Liga in the summer of 2004, signing with U.D. Leiria. He made his debut as a professional on 7 November, coming on as a late substitute in a 1–0 away win against Académica de Coimbra; it would be the first of only two league appearances during the season.

From 2008 to 2013, Faria competed in the Cypriot First Division, always with Enosis Neon Paralimni FC. For the following campaign he joined AEL Kalloni FC, starting in 19 games to help his team finish 12th in the Super League Greece.

Faria split 2014–15 with Valletta F.C. from Malta and Apollon Smyrnis F.C. in the Greek second division. He signed for Livingston on 19 August 2015, agreeing to a five-month contract after a successful trial. His maiden appearance in the Scottish Championship took place only three days later, as he played the full 90 minutes and was booked in a 1–2 home defeat to Falkirk.

Faria left Livingston in January 2016, and signed for Airdrieonians also in the country shortly after. In December, he left the latter in order to return to Portugal.

On 8 November 2018, immediately after retiring following a spell in the Portuguese third tier with Louletano, the 35-year-old Faria was appointed first-team coach at English Premier League club AFC Bournemouth.

International career
Faria represented Portugal at under-20 level, earning his first cap on 5 February 2003 in a 5–2 friendly victory over the Czech Republic in Elvas. He represented the country in the 2004 edition of the Toulon Tournament, scoring an own goal in a 1–0 group stage defeat against Sweden.

Club statistics

References

External links

1983 births
Living people
Portuguese footballers
Association football midfielders
Primeira Liga players
Liga Portugal 2 players
Segunda Divisão players
Louletano D.C. players
FC Porto B players
U.D. Leiria players
S.C. Olhanense players
FCV Farul Constanța players
Cypriot First Division players
Enosis Neon Paralimni FC players
Super League Greece players
Football League (Greece) players
AEL Kalloni F.C. players
Apollon Smyrnis F.C. players
Maltese Premier League players
Valletta F.C. players
Scottish Professional Football League players
Livingston F.C. players
Airdrieonians F.C. players
Portugal youth international footballers
Portuguese expatriate footballers
Expatriate footballers in Romania
Expatriate footballers in Cyprus
Expatriate footballers in Greece
Expatriate footballers in Malta
Expatriate footballers in Scotland
Portuguese expatriate sportspeople in Romania
Portuguese expatriate sportspeople in Cyprus
Portuguese expatriate sportspeople in Greece
Portuguese expatriate sportspeople in Malta
Portuguese expatriate sportspeople in Scotland
Portuguese expatriate sportspeople in England
AFC Bournemouth non-playing staff
Sportspeople from Faro District